Countess of Exeter is a title normally given to the wife of the Earl of Exeter. Women who have held this title include:

Frances Cecil, Countess of Exeter (died 1663) (1580–1663) (2nd wife of 1st Earl)
Frances Cecil, Countess of Exeter (died 1669) (1630-1669) (1st wife of the 4th Earl)
Lady Mary Fane (1639–1681) (2nd wife of the 4th Earl)
Anne Cecil, Countess of Exeter (c.1649–1704) (wife of the 5th Earl)
Sarah Cecil, Countess of Exeter (1773-1797) (2nd wife of the 10th Earl)
Elizabeth Hamilton, Duchess of Hamilton (1757-1837) (3rd wife of the 10th Earl)